Christopher Lamar Lammons (born January 31, 1996) is an American football cornerback for the Cincinnati Bengals of the National Football League (NFL). He played college football at South Carolina.

College career
Lammons played four seasons at South Carolina. In his junior season, Lammons started all 13 of the Gamecocks games and made 53 tackles (four for loss), a sack, five passes defended and finished eighth in the Southeastern Conference with three interceptions. As a senior, he finished third on the team with 79 tackles (three for loss), two forced fumbles and seven passes defended. Lammons finished his collegiate career with 177 total tackles (nine for loss), a sack, four interceptions and 21 passes defended with three fumbles forced and three recovered.

Professional career

Atlanta Falcons
Lammons signed with the Atlanta Falcons as an undrafted free agent on April 28, 2018. He was waived on September 1, 2018, as part of final roster cuts.

New Orleans Saints
Lammons was signed to the New Orleans Saints practice squad on October 3, 2018, but was waived on October 20, 2018.

Miami Dolphins
Lammons was signed to the Miami Dolphins practice squad on November 28, 2018, and there for the rest of the 2018 season. He made his NFL debut on September 8, 2019, in the Dolphins season opener against the Baltimore Ravens, registering one pass defended.
In week 13 against the Philadelphia Eagles, Lammons intercepted a Hail Mary pass thrown by Carson Wentz late in the fourth quarter to seal a 37–31 Dolphins' win for his first career interception. He was waived on December 7, 2019.

Kansas City Chiefs
On December 10, 2019, Lammons was signed to the Kansas City Chiefs practice squad. Lammons remained on the practice squad for the rest of the 2019 season, including during the Chiefs Super Bowl LIV victory. He re-signed with the Chiefs on February 5, 2020. He was waived during final roster cuts on September 5, 2020, and signed to the practice squad the following day. He was elevated to the active roster on December 5 and 12 for the team's weeks 13 and 14 games against the Denver Broncos and Miami Dolphins, and reverted to the practice squad after each game. He was elevated again to the active roster on January 16 and 23 for the team's divisional playoff game and AFC Championship Game against the Cleveland Browns and Buffalo Bills, and reverted to the practice squad again following each game. On February 6, 2021, Lammons was promoted to the active roster ahead of Super Bowl LV against the Tampa Bay Buccaneers.

On December 11, 2021, Lammons was placed on injured reserve. He re-signed with the Chiefs on June 16, 2022. He was waived on January 23, 2023.

Cincinnati Bengals
On January 24, 2023, Lammons was claimed off waivers by the Cincinnati Bengals, but was not added to their roster until after Super Bowl LVII.

Legal issues
Lammons had a warrant issued for his arrest on February 16, 2022, in Las Vegas, Nevada in connection to an alleged assault that included New Orleans Saints running back Alvin Kamara. His attorney filed a motion to have the warrant recalled. The following day, Lammons turned himself in. He was released after going through the booking process and posting a $5,000 bail but was not actually put in a jail cell. He received a felony charge for battery resulting in substantial bodily harm and a misdemeanor charge of conspiracy to commit battery.

References

External links
Kansas City Chiefs bio
South Carolina Gamecocks bio

1996 births
Living people
People from Lauderhill, Florida
Plantation High School alumni
Players of American football from Florida
Sportspeople from Broward County, Florida
American football defensive backs
South Carolina Gamecocks football players
Atlanta Falcons players
New Orleans Saints players
Miami Dolphins players
Kansas City Chiefs players
Cincinnati Bengals players
People from Plantation, Florida